The National Nuclear Agency is an agency of the Albanian government which focuses on nuclear research and development. It is a subordinate institution of the Ministry of Infrastructure and Energy.

Overview
Pursuant to Article 100 of the Constitution, Article 10 of Law no. 9000, dated 30.1.2003 "On the organization and functioning of the Council of Ministers" and law no. 10/314, dated 16.9.2010 "On the ratification of the extended protocol of the agreement, between the Republic of Albania and the International Atomic Energy Agency, for the implementation of guarantees in all nuclear activities in Albania", following the proposal of the Deputy Prime Minister and Minister of Economy, Trade and Energy, Sokol Olldashi, the Council of Ministers approved the creation of the National Nuclear Agency.

The agency is tasked with building the necessary infrastructure, in support of the national nuclear program, as well as drafting the full legal framework, which will support the normal development of the program. The primary duties of the agency as specified in the draft law are stated below:

The agency will supervise all phases and procedures for the construction and commissioning of the nuclear power plant, ensuring the short-term and long-term storage of nuclear fuel, as well as all radioactive materials which are related to the energy production process from the nuclear power plant.

References

Energy in Albania
 
Albania
Nuclear power in Europe by country
Energy agencies of Albania